Palmogloea is a genus of green algae, in the family Coccomyxaceae. , the only "accepted" species listed by AlgaeBase was Palmogloea protuberans (Smith) Kützing, although many more species were listed as "preliminary".

References

External links

Scientific references

Scientific databases
 AlgaTerra database
 Index Nominum Genericorum

Trebouxiophyceae
Trebouxiophyceae genera